is an inhabited island located in Ise Bay off the east coast of central Honshu, Japan. It is administered as part of the city of Toba in Mie Prefecture.

Yatsushiro Jinja, on the island. Archaeologists have found hundreds of ceremonial artifacts, ranging from ancient mirrors to ceramics dating from the Kofun period through the Muromachi period on the island. During the Edo period, the island was used as a prison by Toba Domain, with the sobriquet “Shima-Hachijo” is reference to the prison island of Hachijō-jima used by the Tokugawa shogunate.

The island is the setting for the 1954 novel by Yukio Mishima The Sound of Waves, and has been used several times as a filming location for movies.

The economy of the island is based on commercial fishing in its adjacent waters, and on tourism.

See also
Kamishima Island, Amakusa

References
 Saishin-Nihon-chizu - Atlas of Japan, Imidas Shueisha, Tokyo 1990

Islands of Mie Prefecture